Caron is a hamlet in Saskatchewan, Canada, located on the south side of the Trans-Canada Highway,  west of Moose Jaw along the course of Thunder Creek.

Caron was originally a Canadian Pacific Railway (CPR) siding in 1882, named after Sir Adolphe Caron, then Canadian Minister for Militia and Defence.

The former station is now the community of Caronport (the name "Caronport" combines "Caron" and "airport"). There is no trace of the former runways or taxiways and the airfield is closed to all traffic. Some of the buildings are now the property of the Briercrest Family of Schools.

Demographics 

Gallery

See also 
 List of communities in Saskatchewan

References 

Caron No. 162, Saskatchewan
Designated places in Saskatchewan
Organized hamlets in Saskatchewan
Division No. 7, Saskatchewan